Rhizophascolonus is an extinct genus of diprotodont known from the Early Miocene of South Australia.

The genus was first described to accommodate a new fossil species of Vombatidae, Rhizophascolonus crowcrofti, in 1967. A discovery at Riversleigh was published as another new species in 2018, Rhizophascolonus ngangaba, and further specimens from this area were assigned to R. crowcrofti in the same study.

References

Prehistoric vombatiforms
Prehistoric marsupial genera
Miocene marsupials
Miocene mammals of Australia